Charlotte Taylor may refer to:
 Charlotte De Bernier Taylor (1806–1861), American entomologist
 Charlotte M. Taylor (born 1955), botanist and professor
 Charlotte Booth (rower) née Taylor (born 1985), English rower
 Charlotte Taylor (runner) (born 1994), British long-distance runner
 Charlotte Taylor (cricketer) (born 1994), English cricketer